Miss Universe 1995, the 44th Miss Universe pageant, was held on 12 May 1995 at the Windhoek Country Club Resort in Windhoek, Namibia. Chelsi Smith of the United States was crowned by Sushmita Sen of India at the end of the event. Eighty-two contestants competed in this year. This marks the first and so far only time the pageant has been held in Africa.

Results

Placements

Final competition

Special awards

Contestants

  - Marie-Denise Herrlein
  - Jacqueline Shooter
  - Shammine Tenika Lindsay
  - Deborah Wade
  - Sandra Rivero Zimmermann
  - Donna Landwier
  - Renata Aparecida Bessa Soares
  - Elaine Patricia Henry
  - Boiana Dimitrova
  - Lana Buchberger
  - Anita Lilly Bush
  - Paola Falcone Bacigalupo
  - Tatiana Leonor Castro Abuchaibe
  - Tarita Brown
  - Beatriz Alejandra Alvarado Mejía
  - Maruschka Jansen
  - Clara Davina Rainbow
  - Eva Kotulanova
  - Tina Dam
  - Cándida Lara Betances
  - Radmila Pandzic Arapov
  - Nadia Ezz
  - Eleonora Carrillo
  - Enel Eha
  - Heli Pirhonen
  - Corine Laurent
  - Ilka Endres
  - Sarah-Jane Southwick
  - Helen Papaioannou
  - Alia Tui Stevens
  - Indira Lili Chinchilla Paz
  - Halina Tam Siu-Wan
  - Andrea Harsanyi
  - Margret Skuladóttir Sigurz
  - Manpreet Brar
  - Susanty Manuhutu
  - Anna Marie McCarthy
  - Jana Kalman
  - Alessandra Meloni
  - Justine Willoughby
  - Narumi Saeki
  - Josephine Wanjiku Mbatia
  - Suziela Binte Azrai
  - Sonia Massa
  - Marie Priscilla Mardaymootoo
  - Luz Maria Zetina Lugo
  - Patricia Burt
  - Chantal van Woensel
  - Shelley Jeannine Edwards
  - Linda Asalia Clerk Castillo
  - Toyin Raji
  - Karah Kirschenheiter
  - Lena Sandvik
  - Michele Sage
  - Bettina Rosemary Barboza Caffarena
  - Paola Dellepiane Gianotti
  - Joanne Santos
  - Magdalena Pecikiewicz
  - Adriana Iria
  - Desirée Lowry Rodríguez
  - Monika Grosu
  - Yulia Alekseeva
  - Maria Payet
  - Tun Neesa Abdullah
   - Nikoleta Mezsarasova
  - Augustine Masilela
  - Han Sung-joo
  - María Reyes Vázquez
  - Shivani Vasagam
  - Petra Hultgren
  - Sarah Briguet
  - Liao Chia-Yi
  - Phavadee Vichienrat
  - Arlene Peterkin
  - Gamze Saygi
  - Sharleen Rochelle Grant
  - Irina Chernomaz-Barabash
  - Sandra Znidaric
  - Chelsi Smith †
  - Kim Marie Ann Boschulte
  - Denyse Floreano
  - Luo Trica Punabantu

Notes

Debuts

Returns
Last competed in 1978:
 
Last competed in 1983:
 
Last competed in 1984:
 
Last competed in 1992:
 
Last competed in 1993:

Withdrawals
  - Cecilia Gagliano

General references

References

External links
 Miss Universe official website

1995
1995 in Namibia
1995 beauty pageants
Beauty pageants in Namibia
Windhoek
May 1995 events in Africa